Ypsolopha heteraula is a moth of the family Ypsolophidae. It is known from North America.

References

Ypsolophidae
Moths of North America